Prairie Township is one of thirteen townships in Henry County, Indiana, United States. As of the 2010 census, its population was 5,517 and it contained 1,346 housing units.

Geography
The streams of Aqua Run, Battle Brook, Brave Run, Brown Run, Brown Run, Cemetery Run, Chief Run, Colony Creek, Green Run, Harvey Run, Hillside Brook, Lavender Run, Lick Branch, Little Buck Creek, Moon Brook, Moonshine Run, Mount Run, Port Run, Red Brook, Red Run, Slo Run, Small Branch, Spring Run, Summit Brook and Yellow Run run through this township.

Cities and towns
 Mount Summit
 Springport

Unincorporated towns
 Fayne Siding
 Foley
 Hillsboro
 Luray
 Rogersville
(This list is based on USGS data and may include former settlements.)

Adjacent townships
 Monroe Township, Delaware County (north)
 Perry Township, Delaware County (northeast)
 Blue River Township (east)
 Stoney Creek Township (east)
 Liberty Township (southeast)
 Henry Township (south)
 Jefferson Township (west)

Cemeteries
The township contains six retired cemeteries: Beech Grove, Harvey, Lebanon, Livezey, Evans and Powers.

Major highways
  U.S. Route 36
  Indiana State Road 3
  Indiana State Road 103

References
 U.S. Board on Geographic Names (GNIS)
 United States Census Bureau cartographic boundary files

External links
 Indiana Township Association
 United Township Association of Indiana

Townships in Henry County, Indiana
Townships in Indiana